The 2010 Marshall Thundering Herd football team represented Marshall University in the 2010 NCAA Division I FBS football season. The team competed in the East Division of Conference USA.  The season was the first for head coach Doc Holliday.  Marshall finished the season 5–7, 4–4 in C-USA play.

Previous season
In the 2009 season under former head coach Mark Snyder, the Thundering Herd finished with an overall record of 7–6 and 4–4 within Conference USA. They played in the 2009 Little Caesars Pizza Bowl, defeating the Ohio University Bobcats 21–17. It was Marshall first bowl game since the 2004 Fort Worth Bowl, and the Herd's first bowl win since the 2002 GMAC Bowl. Snyder is currently the defensive coordinator of the University of South Florida Bulls.

Schedule

Game summaries

Ohio State

Rose Bowl MVP Terrelle Pryor picked up where he left off in Pasadena, California, with three touchdown passes, Brandon Saine ran for 103 yards and two scores and Ohio State coasted past the error-prone Thundering Herd on Thursday night.

It was a bleak debut for new Marshall coach Doc Holliday, who spent the last two seasons as an assistant at West Virginia. The Thundering Herd fumbled the opening kickoff and were down 14–0 before running their first play in Ohio State territory.

Ohio State's defense limited Marshall to 44 yards on the ground and 199 total. Brian Rolle picked off Brian Anderson's pass and returned it 30 yards for a touchdown late in the second quarter.

Anderson, who completed 17 of 28 passes for 135 yards, was harassed most of the night. He had an interception and the Herd also lost two fumbles.

External link: http://espn.go.com/ncf/recap?gameId=302450194

West Virginia

Geno Smith rallied No. 23 West Virginia from 15 points down in the fourth quarter to force overtime and Tyler Bitancurt's 20-yard field goal in the first extra session lifted the Mountaineers to a 24–21 victory over Marshall on Friday night.

West Virginia improved to 10–0 all-time against Marshall. Except for their first meeting in 1911, this one was the closest in the series between the state's only Bowl Subdivision schools.

Marshall coach Doc Holliday, the Mountaineers' recruiting coordinator the past two seasons, brought inside knowledge of his former team. Former WVU offensive graduate assistant JaJuan Seider is Marshall's running backs coach and recruiting coordinator, while three ex-graduate assistants at WVU have similar roles at Marshall.

External link: http://sports.espn.go.com/ncf/recap?gameId=302530276

Bowling Green

Bowling Green returned two interceptions for touchdowns, scoring the first 21 points and the final 16 Saturday night in a 44–28 win over Marshall.

The Thundering Herd tied the game at 28 with 1:01 left in the third quarter on Martin Ward's 1-yard run.

The Falcons responded with Bryan Wright's 27-yard field goal, and Aaron Pankratz threw a 31-yard touchdown pass to Tyrone Pronty with 9:21 left.

External link: http://espn.go.com/ncf/recap?gameId=302610189

Ohio

Brian Anderson threw for three touchdowns and Marshall survived on the final play to hold off Ohio in a 24–23 win on Saturday night.

The Thundering Herd led 24–17 when Anderson threw a 12-yard touchdown pass to Antavious Wilson with 8:21 left in the fourth quarter. Anderson, who finished with 295 yards passing, also had passing scores of 45 and 7 yards.

Ohio's Boo Jackson connected with Terrence McCrae on a 36-yard touchdown, cutting the lead to 24–23 with no time left. The Bobcats elected to go for the two-point conversion, but Jackson's pass sailed through the back of the end zone to secure Marshall's win.

External link:  http://espn.go.com/ncf/recap?gameId=302680276

Southern Miss

Quarterback Austin Davis rushed for three touchdowns and threw for another as Southern Mississippi defeated Marshall 41–16 Saturday night.

Southern Miss  built a 28–0 halftime lead after Marshall gained just 46 yards on 23 first-half plays.

The Thundering Herd finished with 180 yards of offense, the lowest total of any Southern Miss opponent since Larry Fedora took over after the 2007 season.

Marshall defensive end Vinny Curry, the national sacks leader coming into Saturday, reached Davis twice to run his season total to eight in five games.

Southern Miss ran its home winning streak to 11 games, and is off to its best start since 2004 when it started 4–0.

External link: http://espn.go.com/ncf/recap?gameId=302752572

Central Florida

Ronnie Weaver rushed for a career-high 150 yards, Jeff Godfrey ran for two touchdowns and Central Florida beat Marshall 35–14 on Wednesday night.

UCF broke open a close game in a steady rain with two touchdowns in the span of a minute in the third quarter and Marshall never recovered.

The nation's ninth-best defense limited Marshall's running game to 37 yards. And on a soggy night, two Marshall quarterbacks couldn't complete enough passes to overcome a big deficit.

The game was stopped for more than an hour in the second quarter due to lightning. Only a few thousand fans returned to their seats when play resumed and halftime was canceled.

External links: http://espn.go.com/ncf/recap?gameId=302860276

East Carolina

Jon Williams ran for 111 yards and a touchdown to help East Carolina stay perfect in Conference USA by beating Marshall 37–10 on Saturday.

Dominique Davis threw for 208 yards and two scores for the Pirates, who are off to their best start in league play since going 5–0 in 2001. The two-time defending league champions have won 10 straight against C-USA opponents, including last season's win against Houston in the title game.

East Carolina shook off a sluggish start by scoring twice in the final 2 minutes of the first half to take a 20–10 halftime lead. The Pirates then scored on their first three drives of the second half to blow the game open against the struggling Thundering Herd.

Before the game, there was a moment of silence to honor the 75 victims of the 1970 plane crash that took place as the Marshall team was returning home from a loss at East Carolina. Next month marks the 40th anniversary of the crash.

External link: http://espn.go.com/ncf/recap?gameId=302960151

UTEP

Tron Martinez gained a career-high 116 yards and scored on a 1-yard plunge with 1:47 remaining to give Marshall a 16–12 victory over UTEP on Saturday.

Martinez's score, the first of his career, was set up by a personal foul penalty on the Miners. The Thundering Herd appeared to tie the score at 12 on Tyler Warner's 19-yard field goal with just under 2 minutes to play. But Warner was knocked over on the attempt, and Marshall got the ball back. Martinez scored on the next play.

UTEP led 12–7 after Kris Adams caught a 23-yard TD pass from Trevor Vittatoe. The Miners opted to go for the two-point conversion, but the play backfired. Donald Brown intercepted Vittatoe's pass and returned it 100 yards for a two-point PAT return, making the score 12–9 with 5:25 left.

External link: http://espn.go.com/ncf/recap?gameId=303030276

UAB

Brian Anderson threw for 304 yards and three touchdowns to lead Marshall to a 31–17 win over Alabama-Birmingham on Saturday.

Anderson, who completed 25 of 41 passes with one interception for the Thundering Herd, threw two first-quarter touchdown passes.

The Blazers tied the game early in the fourth quarter on Josh Zahn's 20-yard field goal.

After the Thundering Herd's Troy Evans recovered his own fumble in the end zone for 24–17, Lee Smith caught his second touchdown pass from Anderson with 5:02 to go.

External link: http://espn.go.com/ncf/recap?gameId=303100005

Memphis

Brian Anderson threw three touchdown passes, all in the second half, as Marshall rallied to beat Memphis 28–13 Saturday for its first three-game winning streak since 2006.

The Thundering Herd overcame a 10–0 halftime deficit.

Troy Evans started the scoring with a 13-yard touchdown run with 9:05 to go in the third quarter. After Tigers quarterback Ryan Williams fumbled a snap, Marshall took over on the Memphis 24, setting up Anderson's 6-yard scoring pass to Courtney Edmonson.

Paulo Henriques kicked a 45-yard field goal to make it 21–13, then Anderson found Evans for a 62-yard touchdown.

Marshall held the Tigers to 241 total yards, 77 in the second half.

External link: http://sports.espn.go.com/ncf/recap?gameId=303170276

SMU

Zach Line ran for 202 yards and a touchdown and Kyle Padron threw two TD passes and ran for a score as Southern Methodist defeated Marshall 31–17 Saturday to become bowl eligible.

Brian Anderson was 24 of 42 for 277 yards and a touchdown but also threw three interceptions for the Thundering Herd, who fell to 0–7 all-time in Texas.

Marshall was held to 50 rushing yards and had its three-game winning streak snapped.

External link: http://espn.go.com/ncf/recap?gameId=303242567

Tulane

Brian Anderson threw for two touchdowns and Marshall jumped out to an early lead to beat Tulane 38–23 on Saturday in the season finale for both teams.

Anderson, who finished with 162 yards passing and one interception, connected with Courtney Edmonson on a 20-yard touchdown to give the Thundering Herd a 14–7 lead in the second quarter.

The Thundering Herd pushed their lead to 28–7 after Kevin Perry scored off a blocked punt and Anderson threw a 19-yard touchdown pass to Tron Martinez.

The Green Wave cut the margin to 14 points with 8 seconds left before halftime when Ryan Grant caught a 12-yard pass from Ryan Griffin. But Tulane pulled no closer after Tyler Warner's 33-yard field goal and Rashad Jackson's 84-yard interception for a score for Marshall.

External link: http://espn.go.com/ncf/recap?gameId=303310276

Team players drafted in the NFL
The following players were selected in the 2011 NFL Draft.

References

Marshall
Marshall Thundering Herd football seasons
Marshall Thundering Herd football